George Henry Evison (25 November 18711928) was a Lancastrian artist and book illustrator who illustrated many cheaper books with his strong line drawings. He illustrated magazines with both line drawings and colour wash drawings.

Early life
Evison was born on 25 November 1871 in Bootle, Lancashire. He was the second child of William Flinn Evison (baptised 24 May 1831October 1872), a clerk for the Liverpool and America shipping trade, and Sarah Ellen Emson (born third quarter 1845), the daughter of a publican. His parents  married on 28 May 1867 at St Simon's Parish in Liverpool. Evison's elder sister Lillie (c. 187025 December 1871) died shortly after he was born. Evison's father died the following year, before Evison's first birthday.

Training
Evison began his career with a five-year apprenticeship to a lithographic artist in Liverpool, while attending evening classes at the Liverpool School of Art. Typically, apprenticeships began at 14 or 15, and Evison would have been fourteen in November 1885. He attended the Liverpool School of Art He was attending the school in September 1888 when he was awarded a small class prize (7s. 6d.) for attendance and success in exams.

However, at the end of his apprenticeship (c. 1890), he was not satisfied with lithography, and gave it up in favour of pen and ink. He studied pen and ink drawing full-time under John Finnie at the Liverpool School of Art, where he won a scholarship worth £60.

He had already begun to have some drawings accepted by Magazines like Pick-me-up or Judy and this success led to him coming to London and joining the Slade School where he worked for 12 months. His April 1900 profile in The Poster and his cover illustration for that month indicate that he had found acceptance in London.

Exhibiting
Evison exhibited seven times at the Walker Gallery in Liverpool and four times at the Royal Academy. His pieces at the Royal Academy were story illustrations in at least two cases. At least one of his works shown at the Walker Gallery resulted in a sale, Tea-Time sold for £10 in 1894.

Magazine illustration
Initially Evison appears to have concentrated on magazine illustration. He contributed illustrations to a wide range of magazines including:
Judy
The English Illustrated Magazine
The Idler
The Poster
The Wide World Magazine
The Strand Magazine
The Bystander
To-day, where he had already illustrated two serials for Barry Pain by 1900.

The Poster reported that by 1900 Evison had already worked for four of the Newnes publications and four of Pearson's publications  as well as other magazines.

Example of pen and ink magazine illustration
Evison was a regular illustrator for George Newnes' Wide World Magazine. He did approximately two dozen illustrations for From Job to Job Around the World by Alfred C. B. Fletcher in Wide World Magazine Volume 37, May–October 1916. The serial story covers the adventures of two young Americans who set out from San Francisco to travel around the world with only $10 between them.

Book Illustration
Evison seems to have made a slow start at book illustration. It was only at the end of the first decade of the 20th century that he began to illustrate any significant number of books, and this grew to a flood with his illustrations of the Daily Mail'''sixpenny novels. 
 
The following list of books illustrated by Evison is far from complete. The principle sources are searches of the Jisc catalogue,{{refn|group=note|The Jisc Library Hub Discover brings together the catalogues of 165 Major UK and Irish libraries. Additional libraries are being added all the time, and the catalogue collates national, university, and research libraries. and the page about Evison on the Charles Pearce Project.

Example of book illustrations
The following illustrations are not from the cheap editions which featured Evison's strong pen and ink drawings, but from a full-priced Christmas book. The book was Under Honour's Flag {Frederick Warne & Co., London, (1907) by Rev. Eric Lisle. Evison provide eight illustrations for the book, painted rather than in the pen and ink which he used for cheaper editions.

Death
Evison died in the second quarter of 1928, probably in early June. He was buried on 5 June 1928 at All Saints Cemetery in Harrow. At the time of his death, he was still living at his cousin's house at Fulwood, Royston Park, Pinner, where he had lived since at least 1905. He appears not to have left a will.

Assessment
Houfe states that Evison was a particularly good figure artist and that he used pen and ink with heavy body colour.. Thorpe noted that his half-tone drawings in the English Illustrated Magazine were promising. A profound challenge for greater recognition of Evison is that a good deal of book illustration, at least, was for ephemeral editions such as the Daily Mail'' sixpenny editions. Such cheap editions uses cheap paper and only the boldest of pen and ink art reproduced well. Evison's bold pen and ink drawings were well suited to this constraint. His magazine illustrations covered a much broader range, and were not just restricted to pen and ink work.

Notes

References

External links
 

1871 births
1928 deaths
People from Liverpool
Artists from Liverpool
English children's book illustrators
English illustrators
English artists
Alumni of the Slade School of Fine Art
Alumni of Liverpool College of Art
Magazine illustrators